Walter Hess may refer to:

 Walter Rudolf Hess (1881–1973), Swiss physiologist
 Walter W. Hess (1892–1972), United States Army general